Dr. Sarika Singh is perhaps the first Indian female painter and teacher in the Buddhist tradition of Thangka Painting.  Born on 13th August,1976, in New Delhi, she began her studies in the art of Thangka painting, in the year 1996, at the prestigious Norbulingka Institute in Dharamshala, Northern India under the tutelage of her master, Tempa Choephel. In the year 2015, she completed her Master’s degree in ‘Buddhist and Tibetan Studies’ from Punjab University, and ‘PhD’ from Central University of Himachal Pradesh in the year 2021.

Along with her husband Master Locho, one of the finest Master Thangka painters in the world, Dr. Sarika Singh co-founded the ‘Center for Living Buddhist Art’ and 'Thangde Gatsal Thangka Studio' in the year 2001. In 2019, they established the Himalayan Art Museum which connects us to the rich cultural heritage of India and Tibet. The museum aims to generate awareness about the Buddhist art through contemporary quality thangka works based on the tradition carried forward by Indian and Tibetan masters. This museum is a window to the 2,300 years old journey of the tradition of Buddhist paintings and the evolution of art through ages and geographies. The museum exhibits the finest master pieces created by Master Locho and Dr. Sarika Singh.

Thangka Painting Contributions

 Created over 300 Masterpiece Paintings in 25 years
 Commissions executed for prestigious 'Patrons' from around the world.
 Travelled and Exhibited across the Globe.
 Created Museum with 45 Masterpiece Paintings depicting 2300 years Journey of Buddhist Paintings.
 Researched and Recreated Ancient Indian Artistic Styles of Ajanta Caves, Tabo and Alchi Monastery.
 Painted Masterpiece Thangka of Dharamsala Tara announcing the Arrival of Thangka Paintings to the Indian Soil.
 Created Thangka artwork that merge ancient Thangka themes with Advanced Technology.
Thangde Gatsal Studio : Teaching

 Committed to Teaching Indian and Foreign Students since 22 Years!
 Authored Thangka Textbooks based on Ancient Tradition.
 Providing Platform for teaching students and artists across ages and geographies.
 Training Materials customised and restructured like never before.
 With the help of the Technology, Designed Distant learning/Self Study Courses for the First Time.
 Collaboration with Indian and Foreign Universities and Museums
 Authored and Published Papers
 Preserved over 10,000 Thangka Drawings
Cultural Contributions

 Served as Expert Advisors to Ministry of Culture, Government of India.
 Ted- Speaker on Transformative Journey of Buddhist Painting
 Highlighting the anonymous lives of artists.
 Helping people cultivate love kindness compassion through Art

Recognitions and awards

          

Workshops and Residencies
 

Exhibitions and Commissions 

2010          Exhibition coinciding with the Teachings of His Holiness the Dalai Lama, Bloomington, Indiana, USA

2008          Exhibition coinciding with the Teachings of His Holiness the Dalai Lama, Sydney, Australia

Exhibition coinciding with the Teachings of His Holiness the Dalai Lama, London, United Kingdom

2007          Featured Artist, Teachings of His Holiness the Dalai Lama, New Zealand

Featured Artist, Teachings of His Holiness the Dalai Lama, Germany

Featured Artist, Teachings of His Holiness the Dalai Lama, New York, USA

Featured Artist, Teachings of His Holiness the Dalai Lama, Bloomington, Indiana, USA

2006          Featured Artist, Teachings of His Holiness the Dalai Lama, New York, New York, USA

2005          Official backdrop Paintings, Shantideva Teachings, His Holiness the Dalai Lama, Commissioned by Arizona Teachings, Inc., Tucson, Arizona, USA

Exhibition coinciding with the Shantideva Teachings, His Holiness the Dalai Lama, Tucson, Arizona, USA

2003          Radiant Transmission: Contemporary Masterpieces of Tibetan Buddhist Art, October Gallery, London, United Kingdom

2002          Official backdrop paintings, Kālachakra Initiation Ceremony for World Peace, His Holiness the Dalai Lama, commissioned by the She Drup Ling Buddhist Centre, Graz, Austria.

Exhibition coinciding with the Kālachakra Initiation Ceremony  for World Peace, Graz, Austria

Publications

·     Singh, S. (2020). Painting Thangkas: Depicting Morality. Artos, 9 (Url: http://www.uaos.unios.hr/artos/index.php/hr/thangka-slikarstvo/singh-

painting-thangkas)

·     Singh, S. (2020). Image and Imagery: Making Buddha. Artos, 9. (Url: http://www.uaos.unios.hr/artos/index.php/hr/thangka-slikarstvo/singh-making-buddha)

References

Indian women painters
Living people
Lady Shri Ram College alumni
20th-century Indian painters
20th-century Indian women artists
Women artists from Himachal Pradesh
Painters from Himachal Pradesh
21st-century Indian women artists
Year of birth missing (living people)